Dulith Herath is a Sri Lankan entrepreneur. He is the founder and chairman of the Sri Lankan e-commerce platform Kapruka.com, Java Lounge and the co-founder of Grasshoppers Pvt. Ltd. which provides logistics to small enterprises in Sri Lanka.

Early life and career
Dulith was born in Colombo. He did his schooling at Royal College, Colombo. Dulith graduated from the University of Kentucky.

Herath founded Kapruka.com in February 2002. In 2016, Herath along with Harsha Liyanage started logistics provider Grasshoppers Pvt. Ltd.

Controversies
Herath has been named in multiple controversies including excise department raid on his office of Kapruka. Herath denied the allegations in a letter to the public.

As global e-commerce started to rapidly grow in Sri Lanka with the increased use of Alibaba, Amazon, and eBay by citizens, Dulith was notoriously lobbying for restricted trade from these global e-commerce channels. Many speculated that his intentions were to create a monopoly for Kapruka for e-commerce in Sri Lanka and act as the middle man taking a commission from all e-commerce sales, rather than allowing customers to purchase products directly at a better price. The move was heavily opposed by the public that condemned the anti-free market sentiments. Dulith was not granted his request by the government, the decision was applauded by the citizens of Sri Lanka.

On March 25, 2020, the Consumer Affairs Authority (CAA) of Sri Lanka personnel raided Kapruka office for selling essential food items at prices far above the maximum retail price (MRP) fixed by the Government. The raid follows complaints lodged with the CAA by people who used the platform kapruka.com to order home deliveries of essential items during the curfew under COVID-19 virus pandemic. Herath faced extensive social media backlash for the reason given by him to overprice essential items.

During the COVID-19 pandemic, a curfew was enforced by the government of Sri Lanka with the effect of restricting the general public's access to groceries. Dulith was found to be unethically taking advantage of the situation at the expense of the public. Dulith was investigated for trying to exploit customers by the authorities, subsequently, Dulith was exposed on video selling items at exorbitant rates to capitalize on the situation. This resulted in severe backlash from the community as they were disgusted by his lack of morals. Dulith was condemned on social media for his illegal and unethical exploitation of a crisis. This led to a general boycott of Dulith's businesses, Kapruka and Java Lounge.

Globalization and the proliferation of internet access in Sri Lanka raised awareness of Western business models, resulting in Kapruka and Java Lounge losing their market share to competitors that set up similar ventures. This has not been favorable for the business's as declining revenues and profits have severely hurt the companies financially. Kapruka has been exposed several times for delivering expired products trying to skim revenue from customers. In addition the company has also faced serious claims of being unable to refund customers and is embroiled in several civil suits. This was exposed on the Kapruka social media page by several customers.

The publicity of the Covid incident resulted in past stories of the unethical practices of Kapruka being brought to light. Several consumers have accused Kapruka of fraud and mismanagement due to the company taking full payment for delivery of goods and not delivering them. Many of these consumers had stated their complaints since 2013 on various independent forums as they stated the company was ignoring them after taking their money. They claimed that Kapruka deleted their comments, so they posted their complaints on independent forums to voice out their frustration and make the public aware. In addition after the Covid incident, consumers claimed that they found it strange that Kapruka had only positive comments on their website but several negative posts on digital spaces such Google reviews and Facebook which led to further speculation that Kapruka was manipulating their reputation. Kapruka currently holds an F rating by the Better Business Bureau due to Kapruka's failure to address customer concerns.

Industry experts suspect that the unethical actions of Kapruka and current investigations  will reflect the true position of the company and its chairman. Kapruka has all the hallmarks of a similar fraud in Sri Lanka done by Blue Mountain Properties in Sri Lanka. The chairmen of both companies were notorious in making outlandish claims on social media to gain the trust of consumers and then failing to deliver, both companies had several negative reviews on independent digital forums but only had positive reviews on forums they controlled, and both companies requested payments to be made upfront without delivery of the final good and then make various excuses when customers request for a refund.

References

External links
 Kapruka.com

Living people
Alumni of Royal College, Colombo
University of Kentucky alumni
Year of birth missing (living people)